Charles Sims was the seventh Surveyor General of Ceylon. He was appointed in 1858, succeeding W. D. Gosset, and held the office until 1865. He was succeeded by A. B. Eyers.

References

S